Petter Hansen is a Norwegian Ten-pin bowler.

Bowling career
He was runner up at the 2004 AMF Bowling World Cup, losing the final match to Finland's Kai Virtanen, 2 games to 1.

He was runner up at the 2006 AMF World Cup, losing the final match to Finland's Osku Palermaa 2 games to 1.

Hansen has 2 EBT titles to his name.

References

Living people
Year of birth missing (living people)
Norwegian ten-pin bowling players
Place of birth missing (living people)
Competitors at the 2001 World Games
World Games bronze medalists
World Games medalists in bowling